Ficus superba, also known as sea fig or deciduous fig, is a hemiepiphytic tree of genus Ficus. It is one of the species known as banyans or "strangler figs" because of its potential to grow as a hemi-epiphyte and eventually progress to the strangling habit of species in this subgenus. It is, however, not an obligate hemi-epiphyte and can be found growing as single stemmed trees in forests. It is found in Japan, Taiwan, Australia, and China, as well as various parts of Southeast Asia, such as Thailand, Vietnam, Java, Kalimantan, the Lesser Sunda Islands, Moluccas, Seram Island, and Peninsular Malaysia.

Varieties and synonyms 
The variety Ficus superba var. henneana grows in Australia where it may reach 35 metres tall.

Other varieties have now been reclassified as synonyms:
 F. superba var. alongensis (Gagnep.) Corner is a synonym of Ficus alongensis Gagnep.
 F. superba var. japonica Miq. is a synonym of Ficus subpisocarpa Gagnep.

Gallery

References

superba
Trees of China
Trees of Japan
Flora of tropical Asia
Trees of Australia
Epiphytes
Taxa named by Friedrich Anton Wilhelm Miquel